Ridge Community High School or RCHS is a public high school located on the Davenport, Florida and Haines City, Florida Line. RCHS was established in 2005 in Polk County. Ridge Community High School is one of many schools with a separate 9th Grade campus with its own front office. The main campus holds students in 10th, 11th, and 12th grade with some exceptions. Ridge Community High School is zoned for Davenport and Haines City. Ridge Community High School's rivals include Haines City High School, Lake Wales High School and others in Polk County. The principal of RCHS is Angela Clark. Ridge Community High School is part of the Polk County School Board. RCHS's mascot is the Bolt, and the school motto is Once a Bolt, always a Bolt.

RCHS serves grades 9 - 12. RCHS is also referred to as Ridge by fellow students and alumni.

Departments
The following departments are offered at Ridge Community High school:
 Agriculture Department
 Exceptional Student Education Department
 Family and Consumer Science Department
 Music Department
 Visual and Digital Art Department 
 JROTC Department
 English Language Arts Department
 Math Department
 Physical Education Department
 Science Department
 Social Studies Department
 World Language Department
 Theatre and Dance Department

Athletics
The Following sports teams are available for students at Ridge Community High School:

Fall sports
 Girls' Volleyball 
 Cross Country
 Swimming 
 Girls' Golf 
 Boys' Golf 
 Cheerleading 
 Football

Winter Sports
 Wrestling
 Boys' Basketball
 Girls' Basketball 
 Girls' Soccer
 Boys' Soccer
 Girls' Weightlifting 
 Color Guard

Spring Sports
 Boys' Weightlifting
 Track
 Girls' Tennis
 Boys' Tennis
 Baseball
 Softball

Notable alumni
Karlos Williams, running back for the Pittsburgh Steelers, former running back for the Buffalo Bills
Vince Williams, linebacker for the Pittsburgh Steelers
Mike James, running back for the Tampa Bay Buccaneers

Overview
Ridge Community High School was ranked as a D school from 2005 to 2010, the school has been recognized for their high standardized Advanced Placement and honors classes. RCHS is now listed as a B Rank school as of late 2012. Students at RCHS can participate in Dual enrollment, chiefly Polk State College. Polk State College is also part of Ridge Community High School, and provides evening classes bearing college credit to students of RCHS for no cost. As of 2015, a new Dual enrollment program with Southeastern University will be introduced starting for the 2015-2016 school year.

References

Educational institutions established in 2005
High schools in Polk County, Florida
Public high schools in Florida
Haines City, Florida
2005 establishments in Florida